Rio de Mouro is a town and civil parish in the municipality of Sintra, Portugal. It is located at a distance of 15 km from the capital, Lisbon. The population in 2011 was 47,311, in an area of 16.49 km².

References

External links
  Official homepage of Rio de Mouro town hall

Parishes of Sintra